The 2014 Copa Federación Venezolana de Ciclismo was a one-day women's cycle race held in Venezuela beginning and finishing in San Felipe on 17 May 2014. The race had a UCI rating of 1.2.

Results

See also
 2014 in women's road cycling

References

2014 in women's road cycling
Women's road bicycle races
2014 in Venezuelan sport